Samantha Schmütz Cannet (born January 28, 1979) is a Brazilian actress and comedian.

Filmography

Television

Film

Web

References

External links
 

1979 births
Living people
People from Niterói
Afro-Brazilian actresses
Brazilian people of German descent
Brazilian people of Austrian descent
Brazilian telenovela actresses
Brazilian film actresses
Brazilian television actresses